The Owl's Legacy is a 1989 French documentary television series created by Chris Marker. Over 13 episodes, each 26 minutes long, it examines the relationship between the modern world and ancient Greece. It consists of discussions with scholars, politicians and cultural figures. The series was filmed in 1987 and 1988 and first shown on La Sept in 1989.

Due to a negative reaction from the Greek financial backer, The Owl's Legacy was blocked from distribution for many years. It was eventually released on home media in 2018. Critics have praised the series as entertaining and stimulating.

Episodes
The 13 episodes are 26 minutes long and were written and directed by Chris Marker. They are built around interviews and discussions with historians, philosophers, politicians and people from the cultural sphere, interspersed with archive footage, film extracts and exterior shots. People who appear throughout the episodes include Jean-Pierre Vernant, Oswyn Murray, Cornelius Castoriadis, George Steiner, Iannis Xenakis, Michel Serres, Theo Angelopoulos, Angélique Ionatos, Elia Kazan, Vassilis Vassilikos, Michel Jobert and Atsuhiko Yoshida. Each episode title consists of a Greek word followed by a phrase sometimes intended to be provocative.

Production
The initiative to The Owl's Legacy was taken by the producer Thierry Garrel in 1987 and the idea originally came from the screenwriter Jean-Claude Carrière. The series was produced by the then new French television channel La Sept with financial support from the Alexander S. Onassis Foundation in Greece. Filming took place in 1987 and 1988 in France, Greece, the United States, Georgia, Japan and Cape Verde. The format was inspired by the ancient Greek symposium, a banquet that included discussions over wine. Four meetings modelled after the symposium were held, one each in Athens, Paris, Berkeley and Tbilisi.

Release
La Sept broadcast The Owl's Legacy from 12 to 28 June 1989. It was shown on British television in 1991. The series was for many years unavailable because of a segment where Steiner argued that modern Greece has nothing to do with ancient Greece. This caused anger within the Onassis Foundation, which chose to block further distribution and responded that without modern Greece, the series would not have existed. In 2007, it was shown as an art installation in Greece, where all 13 episodes ran simultaneously on different monitors.

The Onassis Foundation eventually handed over The Owl's Legacy to the Cinémathèque Française which performed a restoration. In France, Arte éditions released the restored version on two DVDs on 2 May 2018. The DVDs come with a 100 pages long booklet that includes comments from the Cinémathèque Française's president Costa-Gavras. The release was accompanied by an exhibition about Marker at the Cinémathèque Française. Icarus Films released the series on the American digital distribution platform VHX in 2018.

Reception
When The Owl's Legacy was made available in 2018,  of Le Point called it formidable and wrote that it offers "an experience of otherness that is as radical as it is essential for thinking about the world in which we want to live". In Le Monde, Mathieu Macheret called the series stimulating and beautiful, and said he appreciates that it assumes its viewers are intelligent and takes upon itself to spread knowledge. He said the archival material and exterior footage are successful parts of the whole, because they never illustrate what is being said, but add to it. J. Hoberman of The New York Times called the series "at once illuminating and confounding, heady but playful" and said it is entertaining throughout. He said it premiered the same year the Cold War ended and perhaps unintentionally "has the feel of a glorious, collective epitaph" for the 20th century.

References

External links
 The Owl's Legacy at Icarus Films
 

1980s documentary television series
1980s French television miniseries
1989 French television series debuts
1989 French television series endings
French documentary television series
Works about ancient Greece